USS Tinian (CVE-123) was a  of the United States Navy. Ordered and constructed during World War II, Tinian never entered active service and was assigned to the Pacific Reserve Fleet, Tacoma after being completed. In June 1955, the ship was reclassified a helicopter carrier and in May 1959, a cargo ship and aircraft ferry. The ship remained in reserve for her entire career and was struck from the Naval Vessel Register on 1 June 1970 and sold for scrap.

Service history
The escort carrier was laid down on 20 March 1945 at Tacoma, Washington, by Todd-Pacific Shipyards, Inc. Tinian was  launched on 5 September 1945; sponsored by Miss Grace L Woods; and accepted by the US Navy on 30 July 1946. Never commissioned, the escort carrier was assigned to the Pacific Reserve Fleet, 19th Fleet, at Tacoma, Washington. On 12 June 1955, the ship was reclassified as an escort helicopter aircraft carrier and re-designated CVHE-123. In early June 1958 Tinian was taken in tow at Tacoma, Washington, by the US Navy MSTS tugboat USNS Yuma, destined for San Diego, California. While very near the Swiftsure Bank lightship, Neah Bay, Washington; at the entrance of the Strait of Juan de Fuca, Yuma developed engine troubles. Yumas distress call brought  to her rescue. The crew of the Swiftsure lightship went to general quarters, ready to assist. Fir then escorted Yuma and Tinian to safety. On 9 June 1958, Tinian arrived at San Diego, under tow by Yuma, and was berthed at South Tee Pier. In May 1959, she was again reclassified, this time as a cargo ship and aircraft ferry, AKV-23. Tinian remained with the San Diego Group of the Reserve Fleet until 1 June 1970 when she was struck from the list. Her hulk was sold to Levin Metals Company, San Jose California, on 15 December 1971 for scrap.

References

US Department of Homeland Security. United States Coast Guard Historian's Office

 

Commencement Bay-class escort carriers
1945 ships
Tinian (CVE-123)